Bomoseen is an unincorporated village in the town of Castleton, Rutland County, Vermont, United States. Bomoseen has a post office with ZIP code 05732.

References

Unincorporated communities in Rutland County, Vermont
Unincorporated communities in Vermont